İbrahim Etem Erdinç (1913–1998) was a Turkish civil engineer, politician and a former government minister.

Etem Erdinç was born in Kütahya in 1913. In 1937 he graduated from the Istanbul Engineers' School (later named Istanbul Technical University) . He served for Turkish State Railways (TCDD). He was the regional director of TCDD in Sivas. He joined the Democrat Party (DP) and was elected deputy from Sivas Province in the 10th Parliament of Turkey between 1954 and 1957. He returned to politics after 1964 as a member of Justice Party (AP). In the elections for the 1/3 of the Turkish Senate held on 7 June 1964 he was elected senator from Kütahya Province. He kept this seat up to 14 October 1973. In the 30th government of Turkey he was appointed as the Ministry of Public Works serving between 27 October 1965 and 3 April 1967.

He was married and father of three. He died in 1998.

References

1913 births
People from Kütahya
Istanbul Technical University alumni
Turkish civil engineers
Turkish civil servants
Democrat Party (Turkey, 1946–1961) politicians
Justice Party (Turkey) politicians
Members of the 10th Parliament of Turkey
Members of the Senate of the Republic (Turkey)
Members of the 30th government of Turkey
Ministers of Public Works of Turkey
1998 deaths